The North East National Board of School Education  (NENBSE), is the Board of Education for private education, under the Government of ASSAM. It was established by the S.R. Acts XXI of 1860 of the Government of India in 2007 to provide education inexpensively to remote areas. The NENBSE is a national board that administers examinations for Secondary and Senior Secondary examinations of schools.

It had an enrollment of about thousands students from 2008–2012 at Secondary and Senior Secondary levels and enrolls about thousand students annually which makes it the largest private schooling system in the India.

All India Study 
The North East National Board of School Education have all over India regional information centre or study centres.

Courses offered by NENBSE
North East National Board of School Education offer the following courses:

 Secondary Course—
 Senior Secondary Course—Equivalent to class XII (12th)

Examinations
The public examinations are held once a year in the months of March–April on dates fixed by the North East National Board of School Education.

See also
 Central Board of Secondary Education (CBSE),India
 Council for the Indian School Certificate Examinations (CISCE), India ( ICSE and ISC examinations are conducted by CISCE )
 Secondary School Leaving Certificate (SSLC)
 West Bengal Board of Secondary Education (WBBSE), India
 Maharashtra State Board of Secondary and Higher Secondary Education (महाराष्ट्र राज्य माध्यमिक व उच्च माध्यमिक शिक्षण मंडळ) (MSBSHSE), India

References

External links
 

Educational organisations based in India
Distance education in India
School boards in India
Educational testing and assessment organizations
High school course levels